The military engineering of Ancient Rome's armed forces was of a scale and frequency far beyond that of any of its contemporaries. Indeed, military engineering was in many ways institutionally endemic in Roman military culture, as demonstrated by each Roman legionary having as part of his equipment a shovel, alongside his gladius (sword) and pila (spears).

Fabri were workers, craftsmen or artisans in Roman society and descriptions of early Roman army structure (Phalanx, the Legion came around the conquest of Greece) attributed to king Servius Tullius describe there being two centuriae of fabri under an officer, the praefectus fabrum.

Roman military engineering took both routine and extraordinary forms, the former a proactive part of standard military procedure, and the latter of an extraordinary or reactionary nature.

Proactive and routine military engineering

The Roman legionary fortified camp

Each Roman legion had a military legionary fort as its permanent base. However, when on the march, particularly in enemy territory, the legion would, after a day's marching, construct a fortified camp or castra, requiring as raw materials only earth, turf and timber. Camp construction was the responsibility of special engineering units to which specialists of many types belonged, officered by architecti (engineers), from a class of troops known as immunes since they were excused from or, literally, immune from, regular duties. These engineers would requisition manual labour from the soldiers at large as required. A legion could throw up a camp under enemy attack in as little as a few hours. Judging from the names, they probably used a repertory of camp plans from a set textbook, selecting the one appropriate to the length of time a legion would spend in it: tertia castra, quarta castra: "a camp of three days", "four days", etc.

Bridge building

The engineers also built bridges from both timber and stone depending on required permanence, time available etc. Some Roman stone bridges survive to this day. Stone bridges were made possible by the innovative use of the keystone to allow an arch construction.  One of the most notable examples of military bridge-building in the Roman Empire was Julius Caesar's Bridge over the Rhine River.  This bridge was completed in only ten days and is conservatively estimated to have been more than 100 m (300 feet) long. The construction was deliberately over-engineered for Caesar's stated purpose of impressing the Germanic tribes, who had little experience of engineering, and to emphasise that Rome could travel wherever she wished. Caesar was able to cross over the completed bridge and explore the area uncontested, before crossing back over and dismantling the bridge. Caesar relates in his War in Gaul that he "sent messengers to the Sugambri to demand the surrender of those who had made war on me and on Gaul, they replied that the Rhine was the limit of Roman power". The bridge was intended to show otherwise.

Engineering siege machines

Although most Roman siege engines were adaptations from earlier Greek designs, the Romans were adept at engineering them swiftly and efficiently, as well as innovating variations such as the repeating ballista. The 1st century BC army engineer Vitruvius describes in detail many of the Roman siege machines in his manuscript De Architectura.

Road making

When invading enemy territories, the Roman army would often construct roads as they went, to allow swift reinforcement and resupply, as well as a path for easy retreat if necessary. Roman road-making skills are such that some Roman roads survive to this day. Michael Grant credits the Roman building of the Via Appia with winning them the Second Samnite War.

Civilian engineering by military troops

The Roman army also took part in building projects for civilian use. There were sound reasons for the use of the army in building projects: primarily, that if they weren't directly engaged in military campaigns, the legions were largely unproductive, costing the Roman state large sums of money. But the involvement of the soldiers in building works, kept them not only well accustomed to hard physical labour, but also kept them busy, since it was the widely held belief that busy armies weren't plotting to mutiny, whereas idle armies were.

Of both military and civilian use was the construction of roads within the boundaries of the Empire, in which the army was heavily involved. But so too were soldiers put to use in the construction of town walls, the digging of shipping canals, the drainage of land, aqueducts, harbours, even in the cultivation of vineyards. In some rare cases soldiers were even used in mining work.

Mining operations

They were also skilled in conducting mining operations such as building the many aqueducts needed for prospecting for metal veins, in methods like hydraulic mining, and the building of reservoirs to hold the water at the minehead. It is likely that they were also capable of building and operating mine equipment such as water mills, stamp mills and dewatering machines. It is likely that they were closely involved in exploiting gold resources such as those at Dolaucothi in south west Wales. It was developed soon after conquest of the region under Frontinus, and the local auxiliary troop came from north-west Spain, a country where gold mining developed on a very large scale in the early part of the first century AD.

Reactive and extraordinary engineering

The knowledge and experience learned through such routine engineering lent itself readily to any extraordinary engineering foot projects required by the army, and it is here that the scale of Roman military engineering exceeded that of any of its contemporaries in both imagination and scope.

One of the most famous of such extraordinary constructions was the circumvallation of the entire city of Alesia and its Celtic leader Vercingetorix, within a massive length  of double-wall – one inward-facing to prevent escape or offensive sallies from the city, and one outward-facing to prevent attack by Celtic reinforcements.

A second example would be the massive ramp built using thousands of tons of stones and beaten earth up to the invested city of Masada in the Jewish Revolt. The siege works and the ramp remain in a remarkable state of preservation today.

See also

 Technological history of the Roman military
List of Roman Pontoon bridges
Roman architecture
Roman aqueducts
Roman engineering
Trajan's column

Notes

External links
 Traianus - Technical investigation of Roman public works

 
Military engineering